Wikimedia Israel is an Israeli nonprofit organization working in cooperation with the Wikimedia Foundation to promote knowledge and education in Israel through the collection and dissemination of free content and the initiation of projects to facilitate access to databases.

Wikimedia Israel supports the community of Wikipedia volunteers, recruits new editors, establishes collaborations and partnerships, organizes events and conferences, and promotes the exposure of the public and the media to Wikipedia and the importance of free and shared content. In addition to Wikipedia editors, the organization initiates and supports the work of other volunteers (Wikimedia volunteers) who take part in activities organized by the organization and implements its projects and initiatives.

Wikimedia Israel was founded in 2007. It is one of 41 recognized chapters (national nonprofit organizations created to promote the interests of Wikimedia projects locally) around the world.

Wikimedia Israel is the only chapter that operates in a Hebrew-speaking environment, as well as an Arabic-speaking environment.
On July 2, 2014, the speaker of Wikimedia Israel won the Roaring Lion Award from ISPRA (Israel Public Relations Association) in the Technology and Mobile category, for the PR work on the Hebrew Wikipedia 10th anniversary and collaboration with TV Channel 2.

Vision and goals
Wikimedia Israel has adopted the vision of the Wikimedia Foundation, from which the following goal is inferred: “Imagine a world in which every single person on the planet is given free access to the sum of all human knowledge. That's what we're doing”.
Goals:
Promoting knowledge and education in Israel through the collection, creation and dissemination of free content.
Improving the access for free content to all, and making knowledge accessible to everyone in Israel.
Promoting computer systems and internet infrastructure used for collecting and disseminating free content, specifically systems used for Wikimedia *Foundation projects.
Promoting research of social, cultural and practical issues related to free content. 
Promoting and initiating volunteer activities to further the chapter's goals.

Main projects
Supporting the Wikipedia community: social activities, supporting projects initiated by volunteers, etc.
Lectures: lectures about the history of Wikipedia, the basics of Wikipedia and projects initiated by the Wikimedia Foundation. 
Editing workshops: workshops that introduce the participants to the basics of Wikipedia and how to edit it.
Establishing long-term collaboration for the purpose of expanding the Hebrew Wikipedia and other projects. Wikimedia Israel collaborates with cultural and academic institutions, among them the National Library, the Ministry of Education and the Society for Preservation of Israel Heritage Sites.
Writing Wikipedia articles as an academic requirement: Wikipedia and Wikimedia volunteers facilitate courses where writing articles is part of the course requirement.
Outreach programs and activities aimed at introducing Wikipedia, its projects and the principles of free content to decision-makers and the public.
Outreach programs to promote policy that will enable the release of government-held information and content. For example, government decision 5268: Granting free use of images owned by the government on government websites.
Initiating photography contests to expand the online repository of free-use images (Wikimedia Commons) with images from Israel.

References

External links

Wikimedia Israel at the Israeli Corporations Authority.

 
Wiki communities
Wikimedia Foundation
Organizations based in Tel Aviv